Micah is a Hebrew given name.

Micah may also refer to:

Book of Micah, in the Hebrew Bible, attributed to Micah the Prophet
Micah (prophet), its attributed author
Micah, from Micah's Idol narrative in the Book of Judges (Bible)
Micah Challenge UK, British anti-poverty coalition
Micah Clarke, 1889 novel by Arthur Conan Doyle
Micah (novel), 2006 novel by Laurell K. Hamilton
Micah (wrestler), a ring name used by Tanga Loa (born 1983)

See also 

Mica (disambiguation)
Myka (disambiguation)
Micaiah (disambiguation)